= De Zeezuiper =

Wetland in the Netherlands

Coordinates: 51°29′39″N 4°19′44″E

- Interactive map of De Zeezuiper
- Location: East of Bergen op Zoom, North Brabant, Netherlands
- Type: Wetland and former peat-extraction area
- Etymology: Named for its ability to absorb large quantities of water

De Zeezuiper (translated: The Drunkard) is a wetland and former peat-extraction area east of Bergen op Zoom, in the Dutch province of North Brabant. The area originated from medieval peat extraction and later became a large body of water. Its name refers to its capacity to absorb large quantities of water, described as being able to “drink up” water like the sea.

== History ==
During the Middle Ages, a large marsh existed east of Bergen op Zoom. Peat was extracted from the area from the 13th century onwards. After the peat had been removed, an extensive body of water remained.

According to accounts of the area's history, the remaining water could absorb large quantities of water, giving rise to the name "Zeezuiper". The water also served for a period as a water supply for the city of Bergen op Zoom.

== Natural characteristics ==
The Zeezuiper retained its capacity to hold water, and trees growing in the water have been described as appearing to drown. The submerged or flooded trees may have a light reddish colour due to the high iron content of the water. By the late 20th century, drainage had substantially reduced the amount of water remaining in the area. Subsequent measures restored water to the Zeezuiper.

== 2026 drought ==
In August 2026, De Zeezuiper dried out completely during a period of severe drought. According to forest ranger Erik de Jonge of Brabants Landschap, this was the first time in more than 700 years that the marsh had dried out completely, with the ground reportedly having not been this dry since around 1300 and stated that the water level in De Zeezuiper had been declining since the 1970s.

Hundreds of dead fish were found on the dry bed of the marsh. The drought also affected surrounding vegetation. Trees were shedding leaves unusually early as a response to heat and water stress, while between 60 and 80 percent of nearby heathland had dried out.
